The M1127 Reconnaissance Vehicle is a wheeled armored personnel carrier in the Stryker family. It is in service with the US Army.

General
The RV provides an effective platform for RSTA Squadrons and battalion scouts to perform reconnaissance and surveillance operations. The RV accommodates seven personnel, including crew.

The platform is a key enabler for both sensor and HUMINT focused surveillance and intelligence operations.

The recce troop is organized into a headquarters section, a mortar section, and three recce platoons. Each of the recce platoons is organized with four Stryker reconnaissance vehicles, mounting either a 12.7 mm M2 .50 cal or a Mk 19 40 mm grenade launcher; the lead truck mounts a long range advanced scout surveillance system alongside its main weapon. Each vehicle carries a squad consisting of a 3-man vehicle crew and a 4-man scout squad for dismounted reconnaissance (6-man squad if augmented with linguist). Each recce squad in the platoon has assigned a human intelligence collector (35M HUMINT). The mortar section consists of four 120-mm self-propelled mortars (Stryker variant) and a fire direction center.

Operational capabilities
The MAV Reconnaissance vehicle is based on the ICV variant. The Reconnaissance vehicle is based on the ICV platform due to the close parallels of operational requirements and battlefield capabilities between the two systems. The Reconnaissance vehicle is an organic vehicle to the ICV maneuver formation and helps maximize the commonality of the platform, while simultaneously reducing the maintenance footprint and variety of logistics support.

Sources
This article incorporates work from https://web.archive.org/web/20120730024343/http://www.sbct.army.mil/Reconnaissance-vehicle.html, which is in the public domain as it is a work of the United States Military.

See also
 Future Scout and Cavalry System, a joint UK–U.S. reconnaissance vehicle canceled in 2001

References

Wheeled reconnaissance vehicles
Wheeled armoured fighting vehicles
Armored fighting vehicles of the United States
Reconnaissance vehicles of the United States
Reconnaissance vehicles of the post–Cold War period
General Dynamics land vehicles
Eight-wheeled vehicles
Military vehicles introduced in the 2000s
Post–Cold War armored fighting vehicles of the United States
Mowag Piranha